The Acueducto de los Milagros is a Roman aqueduct in Mérida (Badajoz), Spain. It was built during the first century AD to supply water from the Proserpina Dam to the ancient Roman colony of Emerita Augusta. After the fall of the Roman Empire, the aqueduct fell into decay and today it is in ruins with only a relatively small section of the aqueduct bridge standing. The Archaeological Ensemble of Mérida, including the aqueduct, was declared a UNESCO World Heritage Site in 1993.

Description
It is constructed from opus mixtum – granite ashlar blocks interspersed with red brick – utilising a double arcade arrangement.

It is thought to have been constructed during the 1st century AD, with a second phase of building (or renovations) around 300 AD. In later centuries, the inhabitants of Mérida dubbed it the "Aqueduct of the Miracles" for the awe that it evoked.

The aqueduct is preserved as part of the Archaeological Ensemble of Mérida, a UNESCO World Heritage Site.

In the immediate vicinity, a small Roman bridge called Puente de Albarregas runs parallel to the arcades.

See also 
List of aqueducts in the Roman Empire
List of Roman aqueducts by date
Ancient Roman technology
Roman engineering

References

External links 

Aqueducts in Spain
Roman aqueducts outside Rome
Acueducto de los Milagros
Acueducto de los Milagros
Acueducto de los Milagros
Acueducto de los Milagros
Bridges in Mérida, Spain